Hugh Dunham Shine (born July 27, 1952) is a retired United States Army Colonel, financial advisor, and politician. He is a Republican member of the Texas House of Representatives, representing the 55th District. Shine defeated incumbent Molly White in the 2016 Republican primary and went on to win the November 2016 general election. He previously served two terms in the Texas House of Representatives from 1986 to 1990 before vacating his seat to run unsuccessfully for the United States House of Representatives.

Early life 
Shine was born July 27, 1952, in the city of Houston in Harris County, Texas.

Career as a financial advisor 
In 1983, shortly after separating from active duty and while a member of the National Guard, Shine began a civilian career as a financial advisor in Bell County, Texas, in the city of Temple. Shine completed an M.B.A. from Baylor University and later an investment associate certificate through the executive education program of the Wharton School of Business at the University of Pennsylvania.

References

External links
 Campaign website
 State legislative page
 Hugh Shine at the Texas Tribune

1952 births
Living people
Military personnel from Houston
Sam Houston State University alumni
United States Army aviators
Baylor University alumni
United States Army War College alumni
United States Army colonels
People from Navasota, Texas
21st-century American politicians
Republican Party members of the Texas House of Representatives